The following charts below are the family trees of the rulers of the seven emirates of the United Arab Emirates from the 18th century to present day. The House of Nahyan rules Abu Dhabi, the House of Maktoum rules Dubai, the House of Qasimi rules Sharjah and Ras Al Khaimah, the House of Sharqi rules Fujairah, the House of Mualla rules Umm Al Quwain, and the House of Nuaimi rules Ajman.
The ruler of Abu Dhabi generally holds the presidency of the UAE and the ruler of Dubai holds the vice presidency and premiership.

Family Tree of Abu Dhabi Monarchs

Family Tree of Dubai Monarchs

Family Tree of Sharjah and Ras Al Khaimah Monarchs

Family Tree of Fujairah Monarchs

Family Tree of Umm Al Quwain Monarchs

Family Tree of Ajman Monarchs

References

Emirati Monarchs
History of the United Arab Emirates
Monarchs
Monarchs
Monarchs
Monarchs
Monarchs
Monarchs
Monarchs
Monarchs
Monarchs

Emirati Monarchs